Mehdi Tartar (Persian: , born September 24, 1972 in Tehran) is an Iranian association football coach and former player who currently manages Zob Ahan in Persian Gulf Pro League.

In September 2010 he was appointed manager of Iran Pro League team Rah Ahan after a spell as assistant at Persepolis but was sacked by club on July 14, 2011. Tartar was appointed as the head coach of Gahar Zagros for the season 2012–13 of Iran Pro League but he resigned from his position due to the financial problems the club was facing with in that time. He is son-in-law of Firouz Karimi, Iranian football head coach.

Club career

Club career statistics

Last update  June 3, 2010 

 Assist Goals

Honours

Player
Pas
Iranian Football League runner-up: 1997–98

Persepolis
Iranian Football League: 1998–99, 1999–2000, 2001–02
Hazfi Cup: 1998–99

Aboumoslem 
Hazfi Cup runner-up: 2004–05

Managerial
Rah Ahan
Hazfi Cup runner-up: 2008–09

Pars Jam 
Azadegan League: 2016–17

Individual
Azadegan League Manager of the Season: 2016–17
Navad Manager of the Month: August 2017

References

External links
Mehdi Tartar  at WorldFootball.net 
Mehdi Tartar  on instagram 
Mehdi Tartar  at Soccerway 
Mehdi Tartar  at PersianLeague.com 
Mehdi Tartar   at persianfootball.com
Mehdi Tartar  at teammellitalk.com

1972 births
Living people
Iranian footballers
Iranian football managers
Damash Gilan managers
Gahar Zagros F.C. managers
Persepolis F.C. players
Persepolis F.C. non-playing staff
Bahman players
Persian Gulf Pro League players
Azadegan League players
Saba Qom F.C. managers
Association football midfielders
Persian Gulf Pro League managers